Gregory Quick (born April 26, 1964) is a former American football offensive tackle who played one season in the National Football League (NFL) for the Atlanta Falcons. He played college football for Catawba.

Quick was born on April 26, 1964. He attended Scotland High School in Laurinburg, North Carolina, and was named all-east in 1980. He was recruited to the Division I-A LSU Tigers after graduating, but ended up playing college football for Catawba College.

After going unselected in the 1987 NFL Draft, Quick was signed by the Atlanta Falcons as an undrafted free agent. He was waived in August, but re-signed during the Players' Association strike, in which each team hired replacement players. He appeared in one game with the team as backup offensive tackle, a 17–25 loss against the San Francisco 49ers. At the end of the strike, most replacement players were released. Quick said, "I'd jump on a plane and fly to Atlanta and spent a night in Atlanta for $1,000 any time."

References

1964 births
Living people
American football offensive tackles
Catawba Indians football players
Atlanta Falcons players
National Football League replacement players